Daniel Hoban (born 5 April 1998) is a Scottish footballer who plays as a goalkeeper for Scottish League Two club Elgin City.

Career
A native of Inverness, Scotland, Hoban grew up as an Inverness Caledonian Thistle fan and joined the club's youth ranks. He was named on the bench for the senior team for a match against Hamilton Academical in November 2014, before going out on loan to Highland League club Strathspey Thistle in 2016. Loan spells to fellow Highland League clubs Brora Rangers, Nairn County, and Fort William would follow over the next four years, as well as stints at Scottish Professional Football League clubs Elgin City and Forfar Athletic.

In between loan spells, Hoban made his professional debut for Inverness, starting against Dunfermline Athletic on 14 August 2018 in the first round of the Scottish Challenge Cup. He conceded twice, with one coming from the penalty spot, in a 2–1 defeat for Inverness. Hoban also appeared that season in the North of Scotland Cup and was the losing goalkeeper in a final defeat against Ross County.

In June 2020, Hoban was released by Inverness after 12 years at the club. He, along with the rest of the playing squad, had been placed on furlough at the beginning of the COVID-19 pandemic in a bid for the survival of the club, in conjunction with the cancellation of the 2019–20 Scottish Championship season.

After his release from Inverness, Hoban secured a move back to Forfar Athletic on 11 July 2020, signing a one-year contract with the Scottish League One club. Along with his playing career, he entered into a sport management degree at Abertay University.

In May 2021, Hoban rejoined Scottish League Two side Elgin City on a one-year deal.

References

External links
 

1998 births
Living people
Scottish footballers
Footballers from Inverness
Association football goalkeepers
Inverness Caledonian Thistle F.C. players
Brora Rangers F.C. players
Nairn County F.C. players
Forfar Athletic F.C. players
Elgin City F.C. players
Fort William F.C. players
Scottish Professional Football League players
Highland Football League players
Strathspey Thistle F.C. players